Pakwach District is a district in the  Northern Region of Uganda. The town of Pakwach is the location of the district headquarters.

Location
Pakwach District is bordered by Nebbi District to the west, Madi Okolo District to the north, Nwoya District to the east, Buliisa District to the southeast and the DR Congo to the south.

Overview
Pakwach District was created by the government of Uganda in 2015 and became operational on 1 July 2017. Prior to then it was part of Nebbi District.

See also
 Districts of Uganda

References

External links
 Pakwach District Webpage

 
West Nile sub-region
Districts of Uganda
Northern Region, Uganda
White Nile